The 1923 WAAA Championships were the first national track and field championships for women in the UK. The tournament was held on 18 August 1923 at the Oxo Sport Grounds in London, United Kingdom.

Background
After the successful first 1922 Women's World Games in Paris and the three Women's Olympiads (1921 Women's Olympiad, 1922 Women's Olympiad and 1923 Women's World Games) in Monaco the interest for women's sports also grew internationally. In 1922 the "Women's Amateur Athletic Association" (WAAA) was founded in the UK, that year several ”national” women’s track meet were held.

In 1923 the WAAA now organised the first official British women championships in track and field (WAAA Championships). In the US the "Amateur Athletic Union" (AAU) sponsored the first national championship for women in track and field on 29 September 1923.

Events
The meet was held on 18 August at the Oxo Sport Grounds in Downham, Bromley in South London.

The athletes competed in 11 events: running 100 yards, 220 yards, 440 yards, 880 yards, relay race 660 yards, hurdling 120 yards, high jump, long jump, shot put, javelin and track walk 880 yards. 3 unofficial world records were set: Mary Lines in running 440 yards and hurdles 120 yards and Edith Trickey in track walk 880 yards. The tournament was a huge promotion for women's sports.

Results

Many of the participating athletes also competed in the 1924 Women's Olympiad at Stamford Bridge.

References

External links
 WAAA Championships Medallists (National Union of Track Statisticians)
 picture Oxo Sport Grounds (Runner 500)
 picture Polytechnic Ladies Athletic Club (Runner 500)
 "The Official History of The Women's Amateur Athletic Association", Mel Watman, 2012, SportsBooks Ltd

WAAA Championships
WAAA Championships, 1923
WAAA Championships
WAAA Championships
WAAA Championships
WAAA Championships
Sport in the London Borough of Bromley
Athletics competitions in England